Washington is a former commuter railroad train station in the borough of Washington, Warren County, New Jersey. The station serviced trains operated by the Delaware, Lackawanna and Western Railroad on three different lines. Washington station handled the Lackawanna Old Road, which came from Port Morris Junction and continued to Portland, Pennsylvania; the Hampton Branch, which went to Hampton's Central Railroad of New Jersey station in Hunterdon County; and the Phillipsburg Branch, which operated to Phillipsburg Union Station. Washington station contained a single large brick depot and multiple platforms. 

Railroad service to Washington began with the opening of the Warren Railroad on May 27, 1856, between Delaware and Hampton. The Delaware, Lackawanna and Western Railroad took over operations the next year when they agreed to a perpetual lease. Service from the Morris and Essex Railroad joined in 1864, with an extension to Phillipsburg opening in 1865. The railroads built a new station depot in 1867 that would remain until 1900. On December 24, 1911, the Lackawanna Cut-Off opened between Slateford Junction, Pennsylvania and Port Morris, resulting in the station becoming part of a branch. Through the 1920s and 1940s, the Lackawanna started discontinuing passenger services. Passenger service between Washington and Hampton ended on March 20, 1926, and service to Phillipsburg ended on June 20, 1943. The former main line alignment stopped operations north of Washington on March 15, 1944. Service to Washington officially ended on September 30, 1966, when the line from Washington to Port Morris ended service as part of cuts made by the Erie-Lackawanna Railroad. 

Washington station joined the National Register of Historic Places on July 3, 1979, as Washington Railroad Station. The station was demolished in 1982.

See also
National Register of Historic Places listings in Warren County, New Jersey
Lackawanna Old Road
Phillipsburg Union Station

Bibliography

References

External links
Image of Washington, New Jersey Lackawanna station in 1953

Railway stations in Warren County, New Jersey
Buildings and structures demolished in 1982
Former railway stations in New Jersey
National Register of Historic Places in Warren County, New Jersey
Railway stations on the National Register of Historic Places in New Jersey
Former Delaware, Lackawanna and Western Railroad stations
Railway stations in the United States opened in 1856
New Jersey Register of Historic Places
Washington, New Jersey
Demolished railway stations in the United States
Railway stations closed in 1966
1966 disestablishments in New Jersey
1856 establishments in New Jersey